The Evangelical Fellowship of Canada  (EFC) is a national evangelical alliance, member of the World Evangelical Alliance. Its affiliates comprise 43 evangelical Christian denominations, 66  Christian organizations, 38 educational institutions, and 600 local church congregations in Canada. It claims to represent nearly 2 million Christians. The head office is in the Scarborough district of Toronto, Ontario. Its president is Bruce J. Clemenger.

History 

The EFC was founded in 1964 in the Greater Toronto Area in Ontario. J. Harry Faught, a Pentecostal, was its founding president. It has been involved in numerous government bills, regarding issues such as religious freedoms, defining marriage, prostitution, and abortion.

In June 2003, Bruce J. Clemenger became President of the EFC.

Statistics 
As of 2020, it had 43 Christian denominations evangelical members, 66 organizations, 38 educational institutions and 600 member local churches in Canada.  It claims to represent nearly 2 million Christians.

Publications
The EFC publishes Faith Today, a major evangelical magazine in Canada, founded in 1983 under the leadership of Brian Stiller. Love in Action magazine was founded by Joel Gordon and Benjamin Porter in 2010 and in 2016 was rebranded under the name, Love Is Moving - Canada's Christian youth and young adult magazine.

Affiliate denominations 

Source:

In addition, the Anglican Church of Canada and the Presbyterian Church in Canada are observer members.

References

External links
 
 Love Is Moving website
 Faith Today issues available online (2008-present)

1964 establishments in Ontario
Charities based in Canada
Christian organizations based in Canada
Christian organizations established in 1964
Evangelicalism in Canada
National evangelical alliances
Non-profit organizations based in Ontario